Alto Saxophone Improvisations 1979 is a solo album by American saxophonist and composer Anthony Braxton recorded in 1978-79 and released on the Arista label. The tracks were subsequently reissued on The Complete Arista Recordings of Anthony Braxton on Mosaic Records in 2008.

Reception
The Allmusic review by Scott Yanow awarded the album 4 stars, stating: "The thoughtful yet emotional improvisations contain enough variety to hold one's interest throughout despite the sparse setting."

Track listing
All compositions by Anthony Braxton except as indicated
 "Composition 77 A" - 7:30   
 "Composition 77 C" - 6:25   
 "Red Top" (Ben Kynard, Lionel Hampton) - 6:13   
 "Composition 77 D" - 7:30   
 "Composition 77 E" - 4:25   
 "Composition 26 F" - 6:30   
 "Composition 77 F" - 6:19   
 "Composition 26 B" - 6:58   
 "Along Came Betty" (Benny Golson) - 8:00   
 "Composition 77 G" - 5:15   
 "Composition 26 E" - 6:20   
 "Giant Steps" (John Coltrane) - 6:20   
 "Composition 77 H" - 7:00  
Recorded at Big Apple Studios in New York City on November 28, 1978 (tracks 1, 2, 4 & 7), November 29, 1978 (tracks 3, 6, 8-11 & 13), and June 21, 1979 (tracks 5 & 12)

Personnel
Anthony Braxton – alto saxophone

References

Arista Records albums
Anthony Braxton albums
1979 albums